North Miami may stand for:

 North Miami
 North Miami, Oklahoma 
 North Miami High School
 North Miami Community Schools